Bernardus Pieters "Bernard" Loots (19 April 1979, Prieska, South Africa) is a Netherlands cricketer.

2011 World Cup
Loots was part of the squad at the World Cup held in India, Sri Lanka and Bangladesh from 19 February to 2 April 2011.

References

1979 births
Living people
Afrikaner people
Cricketers at the 2011 Cricket World Cup
Dutch cricketers
Netherlands One Day International cricketers
People from Siyathemba Local Municipality
South African cricketers
South African emigrants to the Netherlands